Bruno Lukk (30 June 1909 Tšussovaja village, Perm Governorate – 31 May 1991 Tallinn) was an Estonian pianist and pedagogue. He was one of the most notable piano pedagogue in Estonia.

In 1913 his family moved to Estonia. In 1928 he graduated from Riga Conservatory.

In 1940 to 1991 he taught in Tallinn Conservatory. From 1948 to 1951 he was the director of the conservatory.

Besides teaching, he also gave solo and duo concerts. Over 40 years he did collaboration (as a piano duo) with pianist Anna Klas.

References

1909 births
1991 deaths
Estonian pianists
Academic staff of the Estonian Academy of Music and Theatre